Launched in April 2013, the American Veterans Committee (AVC) is a non-profit veterans organization that promotes networking opportunities for US veterans globally. The organization was launched to make it easier for US veterans to connect with veterans from other countries, expand new employment and business opportunities, while also promoting smart diplomacy. As of 2018, the American Veterans Committee is no longer a membership organization.  

The organization was founded by Iraq War Veteran Saif Khan, who served as President until June 2021. Major General James Kelley (ret.) served as former President. The organization is currently led by Iraq War Veteran Brandon Powell.

The American Veterans Committee is a member organization of the World Veterans Federation. Through the World Veterans Federation, the American Veterans Committee has the ability to connect with veterans organizations from around the world.  The American Veterans Committee also focuses on learning from what other countries are doing better to serve their veterans, and how national, state and local programs in the US can be improved to serve veterans better.

The American Veterans Committee is not related to the organization of the same name that was active from 1943 to 2008.

References

External links 
Official website

American veterans' organizations